The Wisconsin PGA Championship is a golf tournament that is the championship of the Wisconsin section of the PGA of America. It has been played annually since 1929 at a variety of courses in Wisconsin.

Winners 

 2022 Jamie Christianson
 2021 Mick Smith
 2020 Mick Smith
 2019 Ryan Helminen
 2018 Joe Leonard
 2017 Jim Schuman
 2016 Ryan Helminen
 2015 David Roesch
 2014 Patrick Steffes
 2013 Eddie Terasa
 2012 Ryan Helminen
 2011 Eddie Terasa
 2010 Ryan Helminen
 2009 Eddie Terasa
 2008 Rick Witt
 2007 Eddie Terasa
 2006 Charlie Brown
 2005 Jim Schuman
 2004 Larry Tiziani
 2003 Eddie Terasa
 2002 Jim Schuman
 2001 Jim Schuman
 2000 Dave Spengler
 1999 Dave Spengler
 1998 Chad Behrends
 1997 Bill Kokott
 1996 Doug Sheldon
 1995 Eddie Terasa
 1994 Dennis Tiziani
 1993 Eddie Terasa
 1992 Eddie Terasa
 1991 Eddie Terasa
 1990 Eddie Terasa
 1989 Bill Brodell
 1988 Eddie Terasa
 1987 Larry Tiziani
 1986 Bill Brodell
 1985 Tony Wallin
 1984 Dennis Tiziani
 1983 Steve Howe
 1982 Dennis Tiziani
 1981 Tony Wallin
 1980 Steve Bull
 1979 Roy Abrameit
 1978 Bob Brue
 1977 Bob Brue
 1976 Dennis Tiziani
 1975 Rolf Deming
 1974 Bob Brue
 1973 Bob Brue
 1972 Steve Friebert
 1971 Bob Swift
 1970 Manuel de la Torre
 1969 Eddie Langert
 1968 Bob Brue
 1967 Lou Warobick
 1966 Steve Bull
 1965 Mike Bencriscutto
 1964 Steve Bull
 1963 Lou Warobick
 1962 Roy Wallin
 1961 Mike Bencriscutto
 1960 Steve Bull
 1959 Manuel de la Torre
 1958 Randy Quick
 1957 Manuel de la Torre
 1956 Jim Milward
 1955 Manuel de la Torre
 1954 Jim Milward
 1953 Manuel de la Torre
 1952 Butch Krueger
 1951 Joe Frank
 1950 George Kinsman, Jr.
 1949 Butch Krueger
 1948 Jim Milward
 1947 Jim Milward
 1946 Butch Krueger
 1945 Hank Gardner
 1944 Francis Gallett
 1943 No tournament
 1942 Francis Gallett
 1941 Burle Gose
 1940 Butch Krueger
 1939 Burle Gose
 1938 Butch Krueger
 1937 Butch Krueger
 1936 Butch Krueger
 1935 Butch Krueger
 1934 Len Gallett
 1933 Len Gallett
 1932 Len Gallett
 1931 Francis Gallett
 1930 Floyd "Red" Leonard
 1929 Len Gallett

References

External links 
PGA of America – Wisconsin section
WPGA Stroke Play Champions

Golf in Wisconsin
PGA of America sectional tournaments
Recurring sporting events established in 1929
PGA Championship